The 2020 California Golden Bears football team represented the University of California, Berkeley during the 2020 NCAA Division I FBS football season. The team was led by head coach Justin Wilcox, in his fourth year as head coach. The team's offense was led by Bill Musgrave, who replaced Beau Baldwin; Baldwin left to become the head coach at Cal Poly.

On August 11, 2020, the Pac-12 Conference canceled all Fall 2020 sports competitions due to the COVID-19 pandemic. On September 24, it was announced that a seven-game season would be played in 2020, and the schedule was officially announced on October 3. Due to additional COVID-related game cancellations, the Bears ultimately only played four games and finished with a 1–3 record for the season, with the sole win coming against No. 23 ranked Oregon.

Offseason

Position key

Offseason departures
Nine Golden Bears graduated in 2020, and three were selected in the 2020 NFL Draft.

Recruiting

Preseason
On January 3, 2020, Cal announced that it would hire former Denver Broncos offensive coordinator Bill Musgrave as its next offensive coordinator, replacing Beau Baldwin. Musgrave, an Oregon alumnus like Wilcox, began his coaching career as quarterbacks coach for the Oakland Raiders in 1997. He last coached at the collegiate level as an offensive coordinator for Virginia in 2001–2002.

On January 10, Angus McClure was announced as the next offensive line coach. McClure spent 11 years at UCLA. Four days later, Aristotle Thompson was hired as the running backs coach. Thompson was the running backs coach at Cal Poly prior to being hired at Cal.

Cal's defensive line coach, Gerald Alexander, was hired to the same position by the Miami Dolphins on January 24. Cal announced it would hire former Arizona defensive coordinator Marcel Yates to replace him the following day.

On March 4, it was announced that Peter Sirmon would be made co-defensive coordinator alongside Tim DeRuyter.

Pac-12 media poll 
In the 2020 Pac-12 preseason media poll, California was voted to finish in second place in the North Division.

Schedule
Cal's 2020 regular season was announced on January 16. The Golden Bears had 3 games scheduled against UNLV, TCU, and Cal Poly, but canceled these games on July 10 due to the Pac-12 Conference's decision to play a conference-only schedule due to the COVID-19 pandemic.

On August 11, the Pac-12 Conference canceled all Fall 2020 sports competitions due to the COVID-19 pandemic. However, following an agreement that boosted testing capacity for players and personnel, the conference announced it would play a seven-game football schedule beginning in November. The schedule would see Cal play all five division opponents, Arizona State from the Pac-12 South division, and a season-closing game against the equally-ranked team in the opposite division (the division winners will play each other in the conference championship, while the team that finishes second in the North division plays the team that finishes second in the South division).

On November 13, Cal's scheduled game at Arizona State for November 14 was canceled after a COVID-19 outbreak within the Arizona State program. The Pac-12 then announced that Cal would instead play at UCLA on the morning of November 15; the Bruins' scheduled game against Utah had also been canceled after Utah had a COVID-19 outbreak.

Rankings

Game Summaries

at UCLA

at Oregon State

Stanford

Oregon

Players drafted into the NFL

References

California
California Golden Bears football seasons
California Golden Bears football